Pčoliné is a village and municipality in Snina District in the Prešov Region of north-eastern Slovakia.

History
In historical records the village was first mentioned in 1557.

Geography
The municipality lies at an altitude of 335 metres and covers an area of 33.44 km2. According to the 2013 census it had a population of 579 inhabitants.

References

External links
 
 http://www.statistics.sk/mosmis/eng/run.html

Villages and municipalities in Snina District